The Amazing Race 13 is the thirteenth season of the American reality television show The Amazing Race. It featured eleven teams of two competing in a race around the world.

The season premiered on CBS on September 28, 2008, and the season finale aired on December 7, 2008.

Siblings Nick and Starr Spangler were the winners of this season, while former NFL safety Ken Greene and his wife Tina finished in second place, and fraternity brothers Andrew Lappitt and Dan Honig finished in third.

Production

Development and filming

The Amazing Race 13 spanned  in 23 days and visited eight different countries. This included the series' first visits to Bolivia, Cambodia, and Kazakhstan. CBS had originally planned to only air one installment of The Amazing Race (season 12) in the 2007–08 season, but due to the 2007–2008 Writers Guild of America strike, CBS ordered a thirteenth installment as a replacement for programs affected by the strike. CBS greenlit the thirteenth installment on December 9, 2007. Season locations were scouted in January 2008 and filming took place between April and May 2008.

This is the second season with a course that circumnavigated the world westwardly, as most seasons follow an easterly direction.

Toni and Dallas Imbimbo were absent from the finish line, because Dallas had misplaced his passport and the team's money in Moscow, Russia, during the penultimate leg. This had been hinted at in promotional materials aired before the season began, where CBS revealed that one team made "an unprecedented mistake that ultimately prohibit[ed] them from joining their fellow Racers at the Finish Line." The passport was eventually turned in at the U.S. Embassy in Russia, but it was still too late for Toni and Dallas to join their fellow racers at the finish line. Starr Spangler revealed in a post-show interview that they did join the other racers in Portland, Oregon, at a party following the end of the competition.

Marketing
CBS heavily promoted the new season, including placing advertising on the top of three hangar buildings at Los Angeles International Airport prior to the premiere. Unlike other seasons, CBS revealed a location map of where the show would be traveling prior to the start of the season.

Cast 
The cast this season featured a team of fraternity brothers, married hippies, southern belles, businesswomen divorcées, and a retired NFL player hoping to reconnect with his estranged wife. Ken Greene was a safety for the St. Louis Cardinals and San Diego Chargers before retiring in 1984.

Starr Spangler and Dallas Imbimbo, who had competed on opposing teams, revealed in interviews that had been dating long-distance for six months since the show completed taping. The two eventually ended their relationship due to the distance.

Future appearances
Terence Gerchberg and Andrew Lappitt later attended the public start of season 25.

Results
The following teams are listed with their placements in each leg. Placements are listed in finishing order. 
A  placement with a dagger indicates that the team was eliminated. 
An  placement with a double-dagger indicates that the team was the last to arrive at a pit stop in a non-elimination leg, and had to perform a Speed Bump task in the following leg. 
A  indicates that the team won the Fast Forward. 

Notes

Race summary

Leg 1 (United States → Brazil)

Episode 1: "Bees Are Much Calmer Than All This!" (September 28, 2008)
Prize: A trip for two to Belize (awarded to Nick & Starr)
Eliminated: Anita & Arthur
Locations
Los Angeles, California (Los Angeles Memorial Coliseum) (Starting Line)
 Los Angeles → Salvador, Brazil
Salvador (O Rei do Pernil)
Salvador (Praça da Sé )
Salvador (19th Batalhão de Caçadores Military Base)
Salvador (Igreja da Ordem Terceira de São Francisco)
Salvador (Escadaria do Passo  Elevador Lacerda) 
 Salvador → Forte de São Marcelo 
Episode summary
Teams set off from the Los Angeles Memorial Coliseum and made their way to Los Angeles International Airport, where they had to book one of two flights to Salvador, Brazil. The first six teams departed on the first flight via American Airlines, while the remaining five teams departed three hours later on the second flight via United Airlines. However, the first flight ended up being delayed 1:30 hours during its connection in Rio de Janeiro.
Once in Salvador, teams had to go to a sandwich shop, choose a traditional vending cart, take it to the Praça da Sé, and deliver it to a man named Indio in order to receive their next clue. Teams had to travel to the 19th Batalhão de Caçadores Military Base, where they had to sign up for one of three departure times the next morning, and then spent the night under a mosquito net. The next morning, teams had to travel to the Igreja da Ordem Terceira de São Francisco, where they found their next clue.
 This season's first Detour was a choice between Hard Way Up or Soft Way Down. In Hard Way Up, teams climbed the Escadaria do Passo on their hands and knees. At the top, teams were asked how many stairs they'd climbed. If they gave the correct answer, they received their next clue; if they were wrong, they had to climb the staircase and try again. In Soft Way Down, teams had to go to the top of the Elevador Lacerda, an outdoor elevator, and climb down a  cargo net in order to receive their next clue.
Teams had to check in at the pit stop: the Forte de São Marcelo in Salvador.

Leg 2 (Brazil)

Episode 2: "Do You Like American Candy?" (October 5, 2008)
Prize: An off-road vehicle for each team member (awarded to Ken & Tina)
Eliminated: Anthony & Stephanie
Locations
Salvador (Port of Salvador) 
 Salvador → Fortaleza
Caucaia (Cumbuco – Praia de Cumbuco )
Caucaia (Cauípe – Barraca do Manoel)
São Gonçalo do Amarante (Pecém Beach   Port of Pecem) 
Caucaia (Parque de Vaquejada) 
Fortaleza (Cidade da Criança) 
Episode summary
At the beginning of this leg, teams were instructed to fly to Fortaleza. Once there, teams had to make their way to Praia de Cumbuco, where they had to ride a dune buggy along the beach to Barraca do Manoel in order to receive their next clue.
 This leg's Detour was a choice between Beach It or Docket. In Beach It, teams had to travel to Pecém Beach and move a traditional Brazilian sailboat known as a jangada to an inlet in order to receive their next clue. In Docket, teams had to travel to the nearby Port of Pecem and search a computer database for the specific ID number of the shipping container that held their next clue.
After completing the Detour, teams had to travel to the Parque de Vaquejada in order to find their next clue.
 In this season's first Roadblock, one team member had to locate the name of their next destination, which was hidden amongst several advertisements painted along a  wall, in order to receive their next clue.
Teams had to check in at the pit stop: the Cidade da Criança in Fortaleza.

Leg 3 (Brazil → Bolivia)

Episode 3: "Did You Push My Sports Bra Off the Ledge?" (October 12, 2008)
Prize: A trip for two to Cabo San Lucas, Mexico (awarded to Ken & Tina)
Eliminated: Mark & Bill
Locations
Fortaleza (Praia de Iracema – Estátua de Iracema e Martim) 
 Fortaleza → La Paz, Bolivia
La Paz (Plaza Venezuela – Simón Bolívar Statue)
La Paz (Plaza Murillo – Narvaez Hat and Shoe Store)
La Paz (Plaza del Estudiante , Plaza Bolivia & Plaza Isabel La Católica  Mercado de las Brujas) 
La Paz (Plaza Abaroa)
El Alto (El Multifuncional) 
La Paz (Sopocachi – Mirador el Monticulo ) 
Episode summary
At the beginning of this leg, teams were instructed to fly to La Paz, Bolivia. Once in La Paz, teams had to go to the statue of Simón Bolívar, where they spent the night. The next morning, teams had to search the classified ads of a newspaper for their next clue, which directed teams to the Narvaez Hat Shop in Plaza Murillo. There, teams had to buy a traditional bowler hat called a bombin in order to receive their next clue, and were instructed to hold onto their hat for the remainder of the leg.
 This leg's Detour was a choice between Musical March or Bumpy Ride. In Musical March, teams had to travel on foot to three plazas several blocks apart and gather the members of a marching band. After leading the band to Plaza Abaroa, teams received their next clue. In Bumpy Ride, teams had to make their way on foot to Mercado de las Brujas, where they had to ride a traditional wooden bicycle down the steep cobblestone streets to Plaza Abaroa in order to receive their next clue.
 In this leg's Roadblock, one team member had to learn six wrestling moves from luchadoras called the Fighting Cholitas and successfully perform the moves in the ring in order to receive their next clue.
Teams had to check in at the pit stop: the Mirador el Monticulo in La Paz.

Leg 4 (Bolivia → New Zealand)

Episode 4: "I Wonder If They Like Blondes in New Zealand?" (October 19, 2008)
Prize: A trip for two to Rio de Janeiro, Brazil (awarded to Ken & Tina)
Eliminated: Marisa & Brooke
Locations
La Paz (Sopocachi – Mirador el Monticulo ) 
 La Paz → Auckland, New Zealand
Whangaparaoa (Gulf Harbour)
Auckland (Sky Tower) 
Auckland (Mount Eden) 
Auckland (CityLife Hotel)
Te Puke (Kiwi 360)
Te Puke (Kiwi Orchard)  Tauranga (Blokart Heaven) 
Tauranga (Summerhill Recreational Farm) 
Episode summary
At the beginning of this leg, teams were instructed to fly to Auckland, New Zealand. Once in Auckland, teams had to travel to Gulf Harbour, where they had to untie a large Gordian knot in order to retrieve a clue from inside.
 This season's first Fast Forward required one team to climb the mast of the Sky Tower in Auckland and retrieve a Travelocity Roaming Gnome from the top. Ken & Tina won the Fast Forward and received a helicopter ride directly to the pit stop.
 In this leg's Roadblock atop Mount Eden, one team member had to search among several hundred Māori warriors who were performing a traditional haka dance for the one whose tā moko face tattoo matched a selected pattern in order to receive their next clue. If team members chose the wrong warrior, the warrior took the image away and the racer had to start over with a new pattern.
After completing the Roadblock, teams had to make their way to the CityLife Hotel, where they had to use binoculars and spot one of eight Travelocity Roaming Gnomes hidden around downtown Auckland. They then had to retrieve one gnome and found their next clue on the bottom of its base, which directed teams to Kiwi 360 in Te Puke. Teams had to keep the gnome with them for the duration of the leg.
 This leg's Detour was a choice between Matter of Time or Matter of Skill. In Matter of Time, teams had to drive to a kiwi orchard. There, teams had to use their feet to crush a vat of kiwis and produce  of juice and then each team member had to drink a glass of juice in order to receive their next clue. In Matter of Skill, teams had to drive to Blokart Heaven, where teams had to assemble two Blokarts, and each team member had to complete three laps around a track in order to receive their next clue.
Teams had to check in at the pit stop: Summerhill Recreational Farm in Tauranga.
Additional notes
John Keoghan, father of host Phil Keoghan, appeared as the pit stop greeter in this leg.

Leg 5 (New Zealand → Cambodia)

Episode 5: "Do It Like a Madman" (October 26, 2008)
Prize: A trip for two to Saint John (awarded to Nick & Starr)
Eliminated: Aja & Ty
Locations
Tauranga (Summerhill Recreational Farm) 
 Auckland → Siem Reap, Cambodia
Siem Reap (Phlau Ben Lane – Gas Station)
 Siem Reap (Siem Reap Harbor) → Tonlé Sap (Kho Andeth) 
Siem Reap (Angkor Wat) 
Siem Reap (Bayon Temple) 
Episode summary
At the beginning of this leg, teams were instructed to fly to Siem Reap, Cambodia. They then drove the truck to Siem Reap Harbor, where they rode a boat to the floating Kho Andeth restaurant in order to retrieve their next clue.
 This leg's Detour was a choice between Village Life or Village Work. In Village Life, teams had to retrieve a set of toy teeth from a dentist, a doll from a tailor, and a basketball from a floating basketball court. Each team member had to score a basket before returning all the items they'd collected to the Siem Reap Harbor, where they received their next clue. In Village Work, teams had to go to Tonlé Sap, retrieve two full baskets of fish from the water, and then return them to the Siem Reap Harbor in order to receive their next clue.
After completing the Detour, teams had to travel to Angkor Wat in order to find their next clue.
 In this leg's Roadblock, one team member had to search Angkor Wat for an echo chamber within a room called "Prassat Kok Troung". Once there, they had to stand in a specific spot and thump their chest so as to make an echo sound in the room. They could then pick up a stone frieze, which displayed their next clue on the reverse.
Teams had to check in at the pit stop: the Bayon Temple in Siem Reap.

Leg 6 (Cambodia → India)

Episode 6: "Please Hold While I Singe My Skull" (November 2, 2008)
Prize: An electric car for each team member (awarded to Nick & Starr)
Locations
Siem Reap (Bayon Temple) 
 Siem Reap → Delhi, India
Delhi (Moonlight Motors) 
Delhi (Ambassador Hotel) 
Delhi (Prakash Banquet Hall  Dhobi Ghat) 
Delhi (Baháʼí House) 
Episode summary
At the beginning of this leg, teams were instructed to fly to Delhi, India. Once in Delhi, teams had to travel to Moonlight Motors in order to find their next clue.
 In this leg's Roadblock, one team member had cover all of the glass and wheels of an auto rickshaw with newspaper and then spray-paint the black portions with green paint, indicating that the rickshaw had switched to using natural gas as fuel, in order to receive their next clue.
After completing the Roadblock, teams had to travel to the Ambassador Hotel, where they had to search the garden for a doorman, who had their next clue.
 This leg's Detour was a choice between Launder Money or Launder Clothes. In Launder Money, teams had to make a traditional Indian wedding necklace by stapling enough 10 Indian rupee banknotes to the necklace so that they added up to 780. They then had to find the newlywed couple in the crowded banquet hall and present them with the necklace in order to receive their next clue. In Launder Clothes, teams had to use a traditional charcoal iron to press twenty pieces of clothing in order to receive their next clue.
Teams had to check in at the pit stop: the Baháʼí House in Delhi.
Additional notes
This was a non-elimination leg.

Leg 7 (India)
 
Episode 7: "My Nose Is on Fire" (November 9, 2008)
Prize: A trip for two to Kauai, Hawaii (awarded to Nick & Starr)
Eliminated: Kelly & Christy
Locations
Delhi (Baháʼí House) 
Delhi (Kalkaji – Deshbandhu Apartments) 
Delhi (Jain Mandir – Charity Birds Hospital)
Delhi (Chandni Chowk – Gurudwara Sis Ganj Sahib) 
Delhi (Nai Sarak Street  Ram Bhandar & Shwan Kumar and Sons) 
Delhi (Humayun's Tomb – Isa Khan's Tomb) 
Episode summary
At the beginning of this leg, teams had to travel to the Deshbandhu Apartments in Kalkaji in order to find their next clue.
 In this leg's Roadblock, one team member had to climb one of three ladders to find a suspended envelope imprinted with The Amazing Race, among several others that said Try Again, amid celebrators of Holi, the Festival of Colours, who were bombarding them with colored dyes and water.
After completing the Roadblock, teams had to travel to the Charity Birds Hospital at Jain Mandir, where they had to search the birdcages for their next clue.
 For their Speed Bump, Ken & Tina had to serve holy water to hundreds of Sikhs at the Gurudwara Sis Ganj Sahib before they could continue racing.
 This leg's Detour was a choice between Bleary Eyed or Teary Eyed. In Bleary Eyed, teams had to follow a series of power lines on Nai Sarak Street, keeping track of the numbered tags. They then had to report these numbers to a power company official and if they were correct, they could plug in a musical Ganesh statue in order to receive their next clue. In Teary Eyed, teams had to search a spice market for Ram Bhandar, where teams were given two  bags of chili peppers that they had to transport  to Shwan Kumar and Sons and then grind into chili powder in order to receive their next clue.
Teams had to check in at the pit stop: the Tomb of Isa Khan in Delhi.

Leg 8 (India → Kazakhstan)

Episode 8: "I'm Like an Angry Cow" (November 16, 2008)
Prize: A WaveRunner for each team member (awarded to Nick & Starr)
Eliminated: Terence & Sarah
Locations
Delhi (Humayun's Tomb – Isa Khan's Tomb) 
 Delhi → Almaty, Kazakhstan
Boralday (Alel Agro Chicken Factory) 
Almaty (Alasha Restaurant) 
Almaty (Kok Tobe Arch)
Almaty (Almaty State Puppet Theater  & Zelyoniy Bazaar) 
Almaty (Old Square) 
Episode summary
At the beginning of this leg, teams were instructed to fly to Almaty, Kazakhstan. Once in Almaty, teams had to travel to the Alel Agro Chicken Factory in Boralday in order to find their next clue.
 In this leg's Roadblock, one team member had to search among 30,000 chickens for one of seven golden eggs, which they could trade for their next clue.
 In this season's second Fast Forward, teams had to join a traditional Kazakh feast at the Alasha Restaurant, where each team member had to eat a serving of sheep fat known as kurdyuk. Nick & Starr won the Fast Forward.
After completing the Roadblock, teams had to search for a giant crane truck and travel to Kok Tobe Arch. There, at the foothills of the Tien Shan Mountains, teams followed a marked path to a Mongol warrior, who used a trained golden eagle to deliver them their next clue.
 This leg's Detour was a choice between Play Like Mad or Act Like Fools. In Play Like Mad, teams would have traveled to the Kazakh Museum of Folk Musical Instruments, where they would have learned to play a traditional folk tune on the dombra and the shang-kobuz. They then would have had to go to a nearby park and perform for locals so as to earn enough tips in order to receive their next clue. In Act Like Fools, teams traveled to the Almaty State Puppet Theater, where they had to put on a two-person cow costume and travel across town to a milk stand to drink a glass of milk. At the bottom of the glass was the name of their next destination – the Zelyoniy Bazaar – where they had to find the meat section in order to receive their next clue. All teams (except for Nick & Starr, who won the Fast Forward) chose to wear the cow costume.
After completing the Detour, teams had travel on foot to the pit stop at the Old Square in Almaty, bringing the cow costume with them.

Leg 9 (Kazakhstan → Russia)

Episode 9: "That Is Studly" (November 23, 2008)
Prize: A trip for two to Punta Cana, Dominican Republic (awarded to Toni & Dallas)
Locations
Almaty (Old Square) 
 Almaty → Moscow, Russia
Moscow (Krutitsy – Dormition Cathedral)
Tatarintsevo (Kolosok Camp) 
Zhukovsky (Zhukovsky Bakery) 
Moscow (Neskuchny Sad Park) 
Episode summary
At the beginning of this leg, teams were instructed to fly to Moscow, Russia. Once in Moscow, teams had to travel to the Dormition Cathedral in Krutitsy, where they took part in an Eastern Orthodox candle-lighting ceremony. All women were required to don headscarves prior to entering the monastery per religious custom. Teams then received their next clue directing them to the Kolosok Camp in Tatarintsevo.
 This leg's Detour was a choice between Boots or Borscht. For both Detour options, teams had to dress in a Russian military uniform. In Boots, teams had to learn a Russian parade march and then perform one full lap with a drill team to the drill master's standard in order to receive their next clue. In Borscht, teams traveled to a nearby tent and served 75 soldiers a bowl of borscht in order to receive their next clue.
After completing the Detour, teams had to make their way to the Zhukovsky Bakery in order to receive their next clue.
 In this leg's Roadblock, one team member had to unload fifty  bags of flour from a truck and properly deliver them to the bakery in order to receive their next clue.
Teams had to check in at the pit stop: Neskuchny Sad Park in Moscow.
Additional notes
This was a non-elimination leg.

Leg 10 (Russia)

Episode 10: "You're Gonna Get Me Killed" (November 30, 2008)
Prize: A trip for two to Anguilla (awarded to Nick & Starr)
Eliminated: Toni & Dallas
Locations
Moscow (Neskuchny Sad Park) 
Moscow (Severnoye Tushino Park – Submarine Komsomolets of Novosibirsk )
Moscow (Fallen Monument Park, Bukinist Book Store & Bulgakov House) 
Moscow (Sokolniki Park) 
Moscow (   Multiple locations (see below) → VDNKh Metro Station) 
Moscow (VDNKh Park) 
Episode summary
At the beginning of this leg, teams traveled to Severnoye Tushino Park, where they had to search the Komsomolets of Novosibirsk submarine and find the Sonar room. Among the crew members, teams had to find an actor who had appeared in the film The Hunt for Red October, who gave them their next clue directing them to the Fallen Monument Park.
 In this season's final Roadblock, one team member had to count the number of statues of Vladimir Lenin and Joseph Stalin in the park, and then proceed to an antique bookshop on Arbat Street, where they had to give the numbers to the manager. If they were incorrect, they had to wait 10 minutes before they could make another guess. If they were correct, they received a copy of The Master and Margarita by Mikhail Bulgakov, and found a clue about their next destination – Bulgakov's old flat – on the page of the correct answer. They reunited with their teammate at the Bulgakov House, where they received their next clue.
After traveling to Sokolniki Park, teams had to search for a woman with a Shetland pony in order to receive their next clue.
 For their Speed Bump, Andrew & Dan had to perform a traditional Russian dance to the satisfaction of a choreographer before they could continue racing.
 This leg's Detour was a choice between Ride the Rails or Ride the Lines. In Ride the Rails, teams had to take the Moscow Metro from Sokolniki to Ulitsa 1905 Goda, where they picked up a samsa from a snack stand. The wrapper directed teams to Kitay-Gorod, where they had to give the samosa to a babushka near the statue of Saints Cyril and Methodius in Slavyanskaya Square. In return, she gave them a postcard directing teams to the VDNKh Park station, where they found their next clue. In Ride the Lines, teams had to travel by trolleybus from Sokolniki to Krasnoselskaya Station and find a key maker, who gave them a key. The key tag directed teams to the Rizhskaya Station, where they found a postcard with their next clue inside a locker.
Teams to travel by foot to the pit stop: the Central Pavilion of VDNKh Park.
Additional notes
Toni & Dallas were initially denied their clue at the Detour, because they had taken the metro instead of a taxi, as had been required in the clue, and were required to go back to the end of the Roadblock and return to the Detour by taxi. After all of the other teams had checked in at the pit stop, Phil came out to Rizhskaya Station to inform Toni & Dallas of their elimination.

Leg 11 (Russia → United States)

Episode 11: "You Look Like Peter Pan" (December 7, 2008)
Winners: Nick & Starr
Second Place: Ken & Tina
Third Place: Andrew & Dan
Locations
Moscow (VDNKh Park) 
 Moscow → Portland, Oregon
Newberg (Tilikum Retreat Center) 
Cascade Locks (Bridge of the Gods)
Cascade Locks (Cascade Locks Marine Park – Thunder Island)
Portland (Portland Building)
Portland (Standard Building)
Portland (Alder Street Food Cart Pods)
Portland (Voodoo Doughnut)
Portland (Pittock Mansion) 
Episode summary
At the beginning of this leg, teams were instructed to fly to Portland, Oregon. Once in Portland, teams had to travel to the Tilikum Retreat Center in Newberg in order to find their next clue.
 This season's final Detour was a choice between High & Dry or Low & Wet. In High & Dry, each team member had to climb  up a tree, where they had to balance themselves on a log and then jump off to each grab half of their next clue. All teams chose to climb the tree.
After completing the Detour, teams had to make their way to the Bridge of the Gods in Cascade Locks, Oregon, where they had to ride a zip-line from the bridge along the Columbia River to nearby Thunder Island. There, teams undertook a memory challenge. Given an answer board with spaces numbered for the first ten legs, they removed covers one at a time, revealing the symbol of either a Roadblock, Detour, Route Info, or Pit Stop. Teams then had to search through 150 identical clue boxes to find a picture depicting the task or location from that leg. When they retrieved a picture and placed it on the board in the corresponding position, a green light would indicate whether it was correct and if so, they could move on to the next one; otherwise they had to try again. Once all ten spaces were correct, teams could retrieve their next clue directing them to the Portland Building.
{| class="wikitable unsortable" style="text-align:center;"
! scope="col" | Leg 
! scope="col" | Symbol 
! scope="col" | Location
! scope="col" | Country
|-
! scope="row" | 1 
| Route Info || O Rei do Pernil
| Brazil
|-
! scope="row" | 2 
| Detour || Barraca do Manoel
| Brazil
|-
! scope="row" | 3 
| Roadblock || Los Titanes del Ring
| Bolivia
|-
! scope="row" | 4 
| Pit Stop || Summerhill Recreational Farm
| New Zealand
|-
! scope="row" | 5 
| Roadblock || Angkor Wat
| Cambodia
|-
! scope="row" | 6 
| Route Info || Ambassador Hotel 
| India
|-
! scope="row" | 7 
| Detour || Nai Sarak
| India
|-
! scope="row" | 8 
| Pit Stop || Old Square
| Kazakhstan
|-
! scope="row" | 9 
| Route Info || Krutitsy
| Russia
|-
! scope="row" | 10 
| Roadblock || Fallen Monument Park
| Russia
|}
At the Portland Building, teams had to search for a green dinosaur statue located in the adjacent Standard Building in order to find their next clue. Teams were then directed to the Alder Street Food Cart Pods, where they had to search for the food cart selling ethnic food from the country of the last pit stop (Russia), where the proprietor handed them their next clue. Teams were then instructed to travel to the place where "the magic is in the hole", and they had to figure out that it was a reference to Voodoo Doughnut. There, teams found their final clue directing them to the finish line at the Pittock Mansion in Portland.

Elimination Station 
The first five teams eliminated were sequestered at a villa in Acapulco, Mexico to await the finale. Subsequently, eliminated teams telephoned to inform the teams at the villa of their elimination, but continued to run as decoys to throw off spoilers to the final outcome of the season. The sequestered teams met up with the decoy teams in the final destination city, to cheer the final three teams at the Finish Line. (The exception was Toni & Dallas, who were stuck in Russia after their elimination due to the loss of Dallas' passport.)

CBS posted short videos on its website after each episode aired in the Pacific Time Zone to show the eliminated teams interacting at the villa.
After Leg 1, Anita & Arthur were the first team eliminated and sent to the villa. They expressed their disappointment for being eliminated so early but were also appreciative of their surroundings.
After Leg 2, Anthony & Stephanie were the second team eliminated and sent to the villa. Anita and Arthur were surprised but excited that it was them, and Anthony and Stephanie felt welcomed and less depressed over their elimination. Over a meal, they predicted that Terence & Sarah would win. The two teams then enjoyed the sights and sounds of Acapulco.
After Leg 3, Mark & Bill were the third team eliminated and sent to the villa. They were glad that the two teams there were shocked and saddened to hear that they were eliminated. As they retold how they were eliminated, they found Mexican wrestling masks in their room. The six were later brought, at night, to a luchadore exhibition where Anthony and Stephanie had a lack of interest and left to roam the streets instead.
After Leg 4, Marisa & Brooke were the fourth team eliminated and sent to the villa. They were excited on how lavish the villa was. They then discussed what happened in New Zealand before they all went into town and Anthony, Stephanie, and Bill did a bungee jump.
After Leg 5, Aja & Ty were the fifth team eliminated and sent to the villa. Before they arrived, the others went to the market and prepared a celebratory lunch. The teams were surprised that it was Aja & Ty, who brought news about the season. After the meal, Anthony did not offer to help clean, leaving Stephanie embarrassed. Meanwhile, Ty felt awkward and predicted that Andrew & Dan would be the next team eliminated.
Leg 6 was a non-elimination leg. The five eliminated teams went to the beach where they encountered a weird individual who staged a "performance" for the teams in the ocean. There were mixed reactions from the teams with Anita being thrilled and filled with admiration while Ty was having difficulty understanding the different lifestyle of the people in Mexico.
After Leg 7, Kelly & Christy were the sixth team eliminated. They called the villa during the early hours in Acapulco, and recalled their horrifying "Holi Festival" Roadblock experience and gave them an update on the season.
After Leg 8, Terence & Sarah were the seventh team eliminated. Before their phone call, the eliminated teams went to La Quebrada to watch cliff divers. After that, they gave opinions on who would be eliminated next. Most of them thought it would be Andrew & Dan. They were all shocked when Terence & Sarah called, as several were rooting for them.
Leg 9 was a non-elimination leg. While Aja & Ty had a minor tiff with each other, Marisa & Brooke struggled to make toast. Anthony started complaining about how slow time is passing in the villa. All in all, most of the sequestered teams reveal that they are missing home and are eager to return to their normal lives. Most of them wanted to see either Toni & Dallas or Ken & Tina win.
After Leg 10, Toni & Dallas were the eighth and final team to be eliminated. The first five eliminated teams packed-up to head for the finish line location. As they packed to leave the villa, each team recalled their experience with each other at the villa and expressed their excitement for returning home.
Leg 11 was the final leg of The Amazing Race 13. The five sequestered teams arrived in Portland, Oregon, where they checked into a hotel and were reunited with Terence and Sarah. Toni and Dallas then called the six teams at the hotel, breaking the news that they had been eliminated and would most likely not be joining them at the finish line due to their passport mishap. The teams then went to the finish line, where they reunited with Kelly and Christy, and some of the teams again expressed who they wanted to win. Nick & Starr express their joy and disbelief at winning The Amazing Race, while Ken & Tina express their disappointment but vow to make their marriage work. Andrew & Dan express their elation at making it to third place.

Reception

Critical response
The Amazing Race 13 received mixed-to-positive reviews. Diana Steenbergen of IGN called this another successful season writing that "for the most part, the race was designed well, and the tasks were often very funny" and "this season was cast with an adequate bunch of contestants". Arthur Perkins of Reality Wanted praised this season's cast and wrote that "AR13 will rank high on my list of topnotch Amazing Races." Heather Havrilesky of Salon wrote that even after 13 seasons the show "remain entertaining regardless of the personalities involved." Josh Wolk of Entertainment Weekly wrote that he felt indifferent by the end of the season. Michael Hewitt of the Orange County Register called this "a sometimes maddening season." Reece Forward of Screen Rant ranked this season as the show's best praising the cast, humor, and story arcs writing that "It's a season that gets lost in the shuffle a lot of the time due to following one of the most popular seasons among fans, and preceding a season that marked a clear change in the show" but "when it gets the attention it deserves, it's clear that season 13 stands well on its own as one of the funniest, most endearing seasons of The Amazing Race with a unique cast, gorgeous locations, and consistent positive quality episode to episode." In 2016, this season was ranked 16th out of the first 27 seasons by the Rob Has a Podcast Amazing Race correspondents. In 2021, Val Barone of TheThings ranked this season as the show's 6th best season.

Ratings
U.S. Nielsen ratings

Canadian ratings

References

External links
Official website

 13
2008 American television seasons
Television shows filmed in Los Angeles
Television shows filmed in Brazil
Television shows filmed in Bolivia
Television shows filmed in New Zealand
Television shows filmed in Singapore
Television shows filmed in Cambodia
Television shows filmed in India
Television shows filmed in Kazakhstan
Television shows filmed in Russia
Television shows filmed in Oregon